Macrobathra flavidus is a moth in the family Cosmopterigidae. It was described by F.J. Qian and Y.Q. Liu in 1997. It is found in China.

The larvae feed on Cunninghamia lanceolata. They bore into the cone and seeds of their host plant.

References

Natural History Museum Lepidoptera generic names catalog

Moths described in 1997
Macrobathra